Sea Wall or The Sea Wall may refer to:

Seawall, a constructed coastal defence
Sea Wall, Guyana
The Sea Wall (novel), 1950 French novel by Marguerite Duras
The Sea Wall (film), 2008 film based on Duras' novel

See also
This Angry Age, 1958 film based on Duras' novel